Luis Zamora (born 17 February 1948) is an Argentinian lawyer and politician. 

He is the leader of the Self-determination and Freedom party and served as National Deputy between 1989 and 1993 and again in 2001 and 2005.

He graduated in Law from the University of Belgrano. During a visit by president George H. W. Bush to the Argentinian Congress in 1991 in Buenos Aires he screamed at Bush and was sent out of the room.

References
 

Members of the Argentine Chamber of Deputies elected in Buenos Aires
Members of the Argentine Chamber of Deputies elected in Buenos Aires Province
1948 births
Living people